John III, Lord of Werle (nicknamed John van Ruoden; born: before 1300; died: between 1 April and 28 August 1352) was Lord of Werle-Goldberg from 1316 until his death.  He was the son of Nicholas II and Rixa of Denmark.

After the death of his father, Nicholas II, in 1316, it was decided to divide Werle.  John III. took control over the part Werle-Goldberg and his uncle John II took over Werle-Güstrow.  John III built himself a castle in Goldberg.  King Christopher II of Denmark promised John and Lord Henry II of Mecklenburg on 4 May 1326 that he would invest them with Rügen.  However, he had earlier promised the principality to Pomerania.  This led to a war, the Rügen War of Succession.  Under the Peace of Brudersdorf, Pomerania was allowed to keep Rügen, but had to pay Mecklenburg  in compensation.

From 1350, he left the business of government to his son and co-ruler Nicholas IV.  On 1 April 1352, he was already terminally ill.  He died later that year.  He was probably buried in Malchow Abbey.

Marriage and issue 
John III married in 1317 with Mechtild, the daughter of Duke Otto I, Duke of Pomerania.  They had three children:
 John (died 1341)
 Nicholas IV, Lord of Werle-Goldberg
 Mechtild (died 1361), married with Count Otto I of Schwerin

After Mechtild's death, John III married Richaris and had two more daughters:
 Sophia (died 1384), married with Albert II of Lindow-Ruppin
 Rixa, became prioress of Dobbertin Abbey in 1392

External links 
 Genealogical table of the House of Mecklenburg
 Biographical information at emecklenburg.de

House of Mecklenburg
Lords of Werle
13th-century births
Year of birth uncertain
1352 deaths